Wang Qiang was the defending champion, but she chose to participate at the 2015 Internationaux de Strasbourg.

Zhang Yuxuan won the title, defeating Liu Chang in an all-Chinese final, 6–4, 6–0.

Seeds

Main draw

Finals

Top half

Bottom half

References 
 Main draw

ITF Women's Circuit - Wuhan - Singles
Wuhan World Tennis Tour